is a Japanese professional baseball player for the Yomiuri Giants in Japan's Nippon Professional Baseball.

He was selected Japan national baseball team at the 2009 World Baseball Classic.

During a brief stint in the 2010–11 Australian Baseball League season he played for the Melbourne Aces and although he did not qualify for any statistical leaders, he has the highest single season slugging (.859) and OPS (1.359) for any player with more than 50 at-bats (64).

On November 16, 2018, he was selected Yomiuri Giants roster at the 2018 MLB Japan All-Star Series exhibition game against MLB All-Stars.

References

External links

1982 births
Chuo University alumni
Living people
Melbourne Aces players
Nippon Professional Baseball coaches
Nippon Professional Baseball first basemen
Nippon Professional Baseball outfielders
Baseball people from Nara Prefecture
Yomiuri Giants players
2009 World Baseball Classic players
Honolulu Sharks players
Japanese expatriate baseball players in the United States
Japanese expatriate baseball players in Australia